Dr Beyers Naudé Local Municipality is a new local municipality that was established by merging the Camdeboo, Ikwezi and Baviaans local municipalities in the Sarah Baartman District of the Eastern Cape in South Africa. The decision to merge the municipalities was taken by the Municipal Demarcation Board in 2015 but only took effect after municipal elections on 3 August 2016. The new municipality is named after the Afrikaner cleric and anti-apartheid activist Beyers Naudé. Its seat is in Graaff-Reinet.

Geography and people

It is a sparsely populated area, with a population of 79,291 giving a density of only .

80.3% of residents of the municipality speak Afrikaans as their home language, while 14.8% speak Xhosa and 3.2% speak English. 66.9% described themselves as "Coloured", 23.6% as "Black African", and 8.7% as "White".

The principal town in the municipal area is Graaff-Reinet, with a population of approximately 35,000. Other towns include Willowmore, Aberdeen, Jansenville, Steytlerville and Klipplaat.

Government and politics

The municipal council consists of 24 members elected by mixed-member proportional representation. 12 councillors are elected by first-past-the-post voting in 12 wards, while the remaining 12 are chosen from party lists so that the total number of party representatives is proportional to the number of votes received. In the election of 1 November 2021 no party won a majority of seats on the council. On 23 November 2021, a DA-led coalition took control of the municipality.

The following table shows the results of the election.

References

Local municipalities of the Sarah Baartman District Municipality